Moore is an impact crater that is located on the far side of the Moon. Like much of the far side, Moore is located in a region that has been saturated by impacts. Nearby craters of note are Larmor to the south-southwest, and Parsons about the same distance to the west.

This crater has been worn and damaged by subsequent impacts, particularly along the western rim where it is overlain by a double-crater. The interior floor is irregular and marked by a merged chain of impacts that runs from the northwest rim to the midpoint. The satellite crater Moore L is attached to the south-southeast outer rim. To the east, the satellite crater Moore F has a relatively high-albedo rim, and lies at the center of a small ray system.

Satellite craters
By convention these features are identified on lunar maps by placing the letter on the side of the crater midpoint that is closest to Moore.

References

 
 
 
 
 
 
 
 
 
 
 
 

Impact craters on the Moon